Monte Porzio Catone is a  (municipality) in the Metropolitan City of Rome in the central Italian region of Latium, located about  southeast of Rome, on the Alban Hills.

Monte Porzio Catone borders the following municipalities: Frascati, Grottaferrata, Monte Compatri and Rome.

Main sights

It was built starting from 1939, being finished in 1965. It rises above the remains of a Roman villa, the "Matidia's Villa", from the first century AD. Currently the observatory is endowed with the Astrolab and other didactic resources for initiatives to schools, university, associative and private groups.
 The Tusculan Hermitage Monastery was founded in 1607 by Camaldolese Monks of Monte Corona. In 1613 the building was completed. The convent's church is devoted to Saint Romuald. The hospitality to male pilgrims by the hermits is guaranteed. Women are forbidden entry to the Hermitage. An inscription on the wooden door reads, in Latin: "Ecce Elongavi Fugiens et Mansi In Solitudine" (Here I have fled from the world and I established my home in solitude).
 Other sights include the church of St. Gregory the Great, erected in 1666 by Carlo Rainaldi for the Borghese family, and the remains of the ancient Tusculum.

Twin towns
  Saint-Michel-l'Observatoire,  France

References

External links
 Official website
 Official website of the Rome Astronomical Observatory 

Cities and towns in Lazio
Castelli Romani